Walkden North is an area and electoral ward of Salford, England.  It is represented in Westminster by Barbara Keeley MP for Worsley and Eccles South. A profile of the ward conducted by Salford City Council in 2014 recorded a population of 12,232.

Councillors 
The ward is represented by three councillors:

 Adrian Brocklehurst (Lab Co-op)
 Samantha Bellamy (Lab)
 Jack Youd (Lab)

 indicates seat up for re-election.
 indicates seat won in by-election.

Elections in 2020s

May 2022

May 2021

Elections in 2010s

May 2019

May 2018

May 2016

May 2015

May 2014

May 2012

May 2011

By-election 3 March 2011

May 2010

Elections in 2000s

References 

Salford City Council Wards